Flight 541 may refer to:

TWA Flight 541, hijacked on 24 May 1978
Air Philippines Flight 541, crashed on 19 April 2000

0541